Giovanni Gravenbeek (born 11 May 1988) is a Dutch professional footballer who most recently played for SV Spakenburg. He formerly played for Vitesse Arnhem, Willem II, PEC Zwolle, NEC and Dordrecht.

Career
Gravenbeek joined SV Spakenburg in August 2017. In January 2019 the club announced, that Gravenbeek would leave the club at the end of the season.

Personal life
Born in the Netherlands, Gravenbeek is of Surinamese descent.

Honours

Club
PEC Zwolle
KNVB Cup (1): 2013–14

NEC
Eerste Divisie (1): 2014–15

References

1988 births
Living people
Footballers from Utrecht (city)
Association football fullbacks
Association football midfielders
Dutch footballers
Dutch sportspeople of Surinamese descent
Eredivisie players
Eerste Divisie players
Tweede Divisie players
Derde Divisie players
SBV Vitesse players
Willem II (football club) players
PEC Zwolle players
NEC Nijmegen players
SV Spakenburg players
Expatriate footballers in Montenegro
USV Hercules players